Clay-Ashland is a township located  from the capital city of Monrovia in Liberia. The town is in the St. Paul River District of Montserrado County. It is named after Henry Clay — a slaveowner and American Colonization Society co-founder who favored gradual emancipation — and his estate Ashland in Lexington, Kentucky.

Established in 1846, Clay-Ashland was part of a colony called Kentucky In Africa, because it was settled by African-American immigrants primarily from the U.S. state of Kentucky under the auspices of the American Colonization Society.

History
A Kentucky state affiliate of the ACS was formed in 1828, and members raised money to transport Kentucky blacks — freeborn volunteers as well as slaves set free on the stipulation that they leave the United States — to Africa. The Kentucky society bought a  site along the Saint Paul River and named it Kentucky in Africa. Clay-Ashland was the colony's main town.

Notable residents have included William D. Coleman, the 13th President of Liberia, whose family settled in Clay-Ashland after immigrating from Fayette County, Kentucky, United States when he was a boy. Moses Ricks, a successful farmer and Baptist missionary who founded the still-running Ricks Institute in 1887 to provide a Christian education to indigenous youth in Liberia, also grew up in the town. Alfred Francis Russell, the 10th President of Liberia, also resided in Clay-Ashland. Martha Ann Erskine Ricks lived here after her father bought her out of slavery. In 1892 she received a Royal audience with Queen Victoria.

The True Whig Party, which dominated Liberian politics for more than a century, was founded in Clay-Ashland in 1869.

References

Populated places in Liberia
History of Liberia
Montserrado County
Populated places established in 1846
1846 establishments in Liberia
Populated places established by Americo-Liberians